The World According to James is an Australian jazz band founded by James Greening. Their album Wayback was nominated for the 2003 ARIA Award for Best Jazz Album.

Members
James Greening - trombone, pocket trumpet, tuba
Andrew Robson - alto saxophone
Steve Elphick - double bass
Toby Hall - drums
Lloyd Swanton - bass
Tony Buck - Drums
Carl Orr - guitar

Discography

Albums

Awards and nominations

AIR Awards
The Australian Independent Record Awards (commonly known informally as AIR Awards) is an annual awards night to recognise, promote and celebrate the success of Australia's Independent Music sector.

|-
| AIR Awards of 2009
|Lingua Franca 
| Best Independent Jazz Album
| 
|-

ARIA Music Awards
The ARIA Music Awards is an annual awards ceremony that recognises excellence, innovation, and achievement across all genres of Australian music. 

! 
|-
| 2003 
|Wayback 
| Best Jazz Album
| 
| 
|-

References

Australian jazz ensembles